Cushion Kids is an Australian children's television show produced by Kids Like Us and Nine Films and Television. It was created by Helena Harris and Posie Graeme-Evans, who also created Hi-5 for Nine. The live action series features costumed cushion characters and is presented as comedy and drama for children. It aired on Nine from November 2000 to December 2001.

Characters
Polly Posh (played by Yvette Robinson) – A cushion who is elegant and stylish, and does not like messes.
Cosmo (played by Anthony Grundy) – A talented inventor.
Grumpy Lumpy (played by John Leary) – A very grumpy postman.
Pippa (played by Lisa Adam) – A cushion who loves to experience adventure.
Baz (played by Zach McKay) – A talented surfer at the beach and slightly lazy.
Bubs (voiced by Meaghan Davies) – A baby cushion.
Zip the Bird (played by Ben Frost; voiced by Tim Harding) – A bird cushion puppet who serves as the narrator of the program.

VHSs and DVDs
Both Cushion Kids videos were released on VHS in Australia by Roadshow Entertainment and DVDs released in Philippines by Viva Video Inc. in 2007. 
 Meet The Kids (2001)
 Cushion Cuddles (2002)

References

Nine Network original programming
Australian children's television series
Australian television shows featuring puppetry
2000 Australian television series debuts
2001 Australian television series endings
Australian preschool education television series
2000s preschool education television series